Royal Noble Consort Ui of the Changnyeong Seong clan (Hangul: 의빈 성씨, Hanja: 宜嬪 成氏; 6 August 1753 – 4 November 1786) was the beloved consort of King Jeongjo of Joseon and the mother of Crown Prince Munhyo.

Biography

Early life
The future Royal Consort was born on August 6, 1753, during the 29th year of King Yeongjo's reign, into the Changnyeong Seong. She was the daughter of Seong Yun-u (성윤우, 成胤祐), and his second wife, Lady Im of the Buan Im clan (부안 임씨, 扶安 林氏).

Their family was quite poor, and at the time of Lady Seong's birth, her father worked as a steward for Hong Bong-han, the maternal grandfather of King Jeongjo. He later became a military officer, but resigned in 1761, due to embezzlement accusations.

Seong Yun-u's first wife was Lady Ma of the Jangheung Ma clan (장흥 마씨, 長興 馬氏). After her death, he married Lady Im, the daughter of Im Jong-ju (임종주, 林宗胄), a minor government official. She died in 1756, three years after giving birth to the future Seong Ui-bin. Seong Yun-u's third wife was Lady Ji of the Danyang Ji clan (단양 지씨, 丹陽 池氏).

Lady Seong had seven siblings: five brothers and two sisters. Her father died in 1769, at the age of 60.

Life in the palace
In 1762, at the age of ten, she entered the royal palace as a gungnyeo. Because of her father's relationship with the Pungsan Hong clan, Lady Seong became a personal maid of King Jeongjo's mother, Crown Princess Hye.

In 1773, she alongside Princess Cheongyeon and Princess Cheongseon, transcribed the classic novel Gwakjangyangmunrok (comprising 10 volumes, 10 books) to Korean.

Some time before 1782, she received Jeongjo's grace and was promoted to Sangui, a court lady of the fifth senior rank. It is recorded that she was pregnant two times between 1780 and 1782, but both pregnancies ended in miscarriage.

On October 13, 1782, Lady Seong gave birth to her first child, Yi Sun (이순). That same day, she became a Royal Consort, after being elevated to the third senior rank of So-yong. Almost three months later, in late December 1782, her son was given the title of Prince Royal (원자, 元子).

The following year, Seong So-yong was promoted to the first senior rank of Bin and Jeongjo personally chose the prefix "Ui" (宜; meaning "appropriate/fitting") for her.

On March 20, 1784, Lady Seong gave birth to an unnamed daughter, who died a few weeks after birth.

On July 2, 1784, Yi Sun was invested as Crown Prince (왕세자, 王世子), but he died during an epidemic, on June 6, 1786.

Death
Four months after the death of her son, Seong Ui-bin died of a disease during the last month of her fifth pregnancy. The unborn child died with her. King Jeongjo wrote her an epitaph, where he described his grief and declared his love for her. It was said that Lady Seong was the only woman he loved amongst his wives. Her mortuary was set up at Anhyeon Palace, which was uncommon.

Originally, she was buried about 100 steps from her son, Crown Prince Munhyo. The graves were called Hyochangmyo (효창묘, 孝昌墓), but during the 7th year of King Gojong's reign, the status of the tombs was raised to Hyochangwon (효창원, 孝昌園).

King Jeongjo planted 26.000 trees in the graveyard, which is known today as "Hyochang Park" and is situated in Yongsan District, Seoul.

In 1944, during the Japanese occupation, the tombs were relocated to the Seosamneung Cluster in Goyang, Gyeonggi Province. Crown Prince Munhyo was buried next to his uncle, Crown Prince Uiso, while Seong Ui-bin was buried 2 km away, in the concubines' cemetery. Her tomb is known as Uibinmyo (의빈묘, 宜嬪墓).

Lady Seong's memorial tablet was enshrined in Uibingung (의빈궁, 宜嬪宮), at the Chilgung (also known as "The Palace of Seven Royal Concubines"; Historical Site No. 149). In 1908, the 2nd year of Emperor Yunghui's reign, Uibingung was closed. However, the name was preserved and the annual rituals continued to be held.

Family
 Father: Seong Yun-u (성윤우, 成胤祐) (1709 – 1769)
 Grandfather: Seong Soo-san (성수산, 成壽山) (1668 – 1749)
 Step-grandmother: Lady Kim of the Gimhae Kim clan (김해 김씨, 金海 金氏) (1674 – 1698)
 Grandmother: Lady Hwang of the Changwon Hwang clan (창원 황씨, 昌原 黄氏) (1677 – 1747)
 Uncle: Seong Yun-jo (성윤조, 成胤祚)
 Aunt-in-law: Lady Park of the Miryang Park clan (밀양 박씨, 密陽 朴氏)
 Cousin: Seong Ho (성호, 成灝)
 Cousin-in-law: Lady Kim of the Gyeongju Kim clan (경주 김씨, 金海 金氏)
 Cousin: Seong Yeon (성연, 成淵)
 Cousin-in-law: Lady Shim of the Cheongsong Shim clan (청송 심씨, 靑松 沈氏) (심억, 沈億)
 Uncle: Seong Yun-ji (성연지, 成淵祉)
 Aunt: Lady Seong of the Changnyeong Seong clan (창녕 성씨, 昌寧 成氏)
 Uncle-in-law: Jeong Hui-gyu (정희규, 鄭熙揆), of the Yeonil Jeong clan (연일 정씨, 延日 鄭氏)
 Aunt: Lady Seong of the Changnyeong Seong clan (창녕 성씨, 昌寧 成氏)
 Uncle-in-law: Im Seong-jing (임성징, 林聖徴), of the Imcheon Im clan (임천 임씨, 林川 林氏)
 Mother: Lady Im of the Buan Im clan (부안 임씨, 扶安 林氏) (1722 – 1756)
 Grandfather: Im Jong-ju (임종주, 林宗胄)
 Stepmother: Lady Ma of the Jangheung Ma clan (장흥 마씨, 長興 馬氏) (1715 – ?)
 Stepmother: Lady Ji of the Danyang Ji clan (단양 지씨, 丹陽 池氏)
Sibling(s)
 Older brother: Seong Dam (성담, 成湛) (1741 – 1783)
 Sister-in-law: Lady Yi of the Seongju Yi clan (성주 이씨, 星州 李氏) (1739 – 1770)
 Sister-in-law: Lady Yi of the Jeonju Yi clan (전주 이씨, 全州 李氏) (1751 – 1799)
 Nephew: Seong Guk-min (성국민, 成國民) (1766 – 1809)
 Niece-in-law: Lady Yu of the Gangneung Yu clan (강릉 유씨, 江陵 劉氏) (1768 – 1809)
 Nephew: Seong Hui-min (성희민, 成羲民) (1780 – 1809)
 Niece-in-law: Lady Yi of the Jeonju Yi clan (전주 이씨, 全州 李氏)
 Older brother: Seong Hyeob (성협, 成浹) (1742 – 1810)
 Sister-in-law: Lady Choe of the Gangneung Choe clan (강릉 최씨, 江陵 崔氏)
 Sister-in-law: Lady Moon of the Danyang Moon clan (단양 문씨, 丹陽 文氏)
 Nephew: Seong Do-min (성도민, 成道民)
 Niece-in-law: Lady Park of the Miryang Park clan (밀양 박씨, 密陽 朴氏)
 Nephew: Seong Ho-min (성호민, 成皥民)
 Niece-in-law: Lady Han of the Cheongju Han clan (청주 한씨, 淸州 韓氏)
 Older brother: Seong Wan (성완, 成浣) (1743 – 1806)
 Sister-in-law: Lady Han of the Cheongju Han clan (청주 한씨, 淸州 韓氏l) (1742 – 1794)
 Nephew: Seong Sun-min (성순민, 成舜民) (1763 – 1849)
 Niece-in-law: Lady U of the Danyang Woo clan (단양 우씨, 丹陽 禹氏)
 Nephew: Seong Deok-min (성덕민, 成德民) (1782 – 1828)
 Niece-in-law: Lady Nam of the Uiryeong Nam clan (의령 남씨, 宜寧 南氏) (1780 – 1812)
 Niece: Lady Seong of the Changnyeong Seong clan (창녕 성씨, 昌寧 成氏)
 Nephew-in-law: Jo Sang-ju (조상주, 趙尙周), of the Hanyang Jo clan (한양 조씨, 漢陽 趙氏)
 Older brother: Seong Suk (성숙, 成淑)
 Sister-in-law: ?
 Nephew: Seong Yeo-min (성여민, 成與民)
 Older sister: Lady Seong of the Changnyeong Seong clan (창녕 성씨, 昌寧 成氏)
 Brother-in-law: Kang Deok-sun (강덕순, 康德淳), of the Seungpyeong Kang clan (승평 강씨, 昇平 康氏)
 Older sister: Lady Seong of the Changnyeong Seong clan (창녕 성씨, 昌寧 成氏)
 Brother-in-law: Yun Gwi-young (윤귀영, 尹貴永), of the Papyeong Yun clan (파평 윤씨, 坡平 尹氏)
 Nephew: Yun In-seok (윤인석, 尹仁錫)
 Younger brother: Seong Heub (성흡, 成洽) (1762 – ?)
 Sister-in-law: Lady Na of the Geumcheon Na clan (금천 나씨, 錦川 羅氏)
 Nephew: Seong Jun-min (성준민, 成俊民)
Husband
 Yi San, King Jeongjo of Joseon (조선 정조 이산, 朝鮮 正祖 李祘) (28 October 1752 – 18 August 1800)
 Father-in-law: King Jangjo of Joseon (조선 장조, 朝鮮 莊祖) (13 February 1735 – 12 July 1762)
 Mother-in-law: Queen Heongyeong of the Pungsan Hong clan (헌경왕후 홍씨, 獻敬王后 洪氏) (6 August 1735 – 13 January 1816)
Issue(s)
 Miscarriage (8 December 1780)
Miscarriage (July 1781)
Yi Sun, Crown Prince Munhyo (문효세자 이순, 文孝世子 李㬀) (13 October 1782 – 6 June 1786), first son
 First daughter (20 March – 12 May 1784)
 Unborn child

In popular culture
 Portrayed by Lee Han-na and Han Ji-min in the 2007 MBC TV series Lee San, Wind of the Palace.
 Portrayed by Lee Seol-ah and Lee Se-young in the 2021 MBC TV series The Red Sleeve.

Notes

References 

18th-century Korean people
1753 births
1786 deaths
Royal consorts of the Joseon dynasty
18th-century Korean women